Eltra Corp. v. Ringer, 579 F.2d 294 (4th Cir. 1978), was a case in the United States Court of Appeals for the Fourth Circuit that determined that typefaces were not eligible for protection under U.S. copyright law. The United States Copyright Office had refused to register a typeface design owned by Eltra Corporation, who filed suit in the U.S. District Court for the Eastern District of Virginia. The district court held that the design submitted did not qualify as a "work of art" under Regulation 202.10(c) of the 1909 Copyright Act. The appellate court affirmed this decision.

Background
Eltra Corp is a typesetting equipment manufacturer who filed a copyright registration on an alphabet and other typographical symbols for its equipment. Eltra hired a designer to produce a custom typeface for $11,000. Eltra registered the typeface with the Copyright Office as a "work of art", which was rejected. Following the rejection Eltra filed a case with the U.S. District Court for the Eastern District of Virginia who denied a motions for summary judgment and dismissed the action arguing that no element in combination or alone can be considered a work of art under § 5(g) of the Copyright Act. Eltra appealed the decision.

Opinion
Donald S. Russell wrote the opinion affirming the decision of the district court. Russell argues that a type face is an industrial design and that there is a distinction between copyrightable works of applied art and uncopyrighted works of industrial design. The distinction is expressed in the regulation and the intent of the 1976 revision of the Copyright Act, when it was written.

External links
 text of the Fourth Circuit opinion

United States copyright case law
Typography
1978 in United States case law
United States Court of Appeals for the Fourth Circuit cases